Anna Hormouz, also known as Mrs. Anna Raffi, was the wife of renowned Armenian novelist Raffi and mother of Aram and Arshak Melik-Hakobian. Anna was largely responsible for the publication of her husband's works in London after he passed, as well as, a devoted scholar of the Armenian question.

Biography 

Anna Hormouz was born in Qajar Persia to an Assyrian Protestant family. In 1863, she married her husband Raffi, an Armenian author and leading figure in 19th-century Armenian literature, whom she met in Salmas. They went on to have two sons, Aram and Arshak Melik-Hakobian, and a daughter, Esther, who died at a young age. Anna was widowed in 1880 by the death of her husband. She and her two sons left Tbilisi for St.Petersburg due to financial difficulties. She eventually ended up in London at the end of the 19th century where she became an active scholar of the Armenian question. Anna went on to devote the rest of her life to the publication of her husbands works with the help of the Mekhitarist congregation in Vienna. Additionally, she worked on fixing the mistakes in the biography of her husband.

One of Raffi's best friends, M.  Veratsin, who had been close to them for many years, described Anna Hormouz in an article published in the "Hayrenik" magazine about "Raffi and his family (memories and reflections).  

Anna Hormouz died a widow in London in June 1920.

See also 

 Grigor Artsruni
 Women in Armenia

References 

1920 deaths
Iranian Assyrian people
People of Qajar Iran
Iranian emigrants to the United Kingdom
British people of Assyrian descent